Narayan Hemchandra Divecha (1855–1904), commonly known as Narayan Hemchandra, was a Gujarati autobiographer, translator and critic. He travelled extensively and wrote autobiography, novels, stories and criticism. He was a prolific translator and credited with introducing Bengali literature to Gujarat.

Biography 
Narayan Hemchandra Divecha was born in 1855 in Diu and spent most of his life in Bombay (now Mumbai). He had not studied much but had travelled extensively. He went to England four times. In 1875, he went to Allahabad with Navinchandra Roy where he started translating. He is credited with introducing Bengali literature to Gujarat.

He had influenced Mahatma Gandhi. Gandhi met him in England and described him as a queerly-looking and queerly dressed person. But he was not ashamed of his looks, clothes or poor English. Gandhi observed in Satyana Prayogo his great penchant to learn foreign languages to read their literature.

Works 
Hemchandra had written about two hundred works. Hu Pote (1900) was the first autobiography published in Gujarati language although the first autobiography was written by Narmad (published in 1933). It is partially travelogue and was written on first 34 years of his life including his travels and experiences. He has also written about Debendranath Tagore and Dayanand Saraswati in it.

Panch Varta (1903) and Phooldani Ane Biji Vartao (1903) are collections of his stories. Vaidyakanya (1895), Snehkutir (1896), Roopnagarni Rajkunwari (1904) are his novels. His works on criticism include: Jivancharitra Vishe Charcha (1895), Sahitaycharcha (1896), Kalidas Ane Shakespeare (1900). Dharmik Purusho (June 1893), published by Gujarat Vernacular Society contains the life sketches of twelve prophets and saints like Chaitanya, Nanak, Kabir and Ramakrishna. He had also written a biography on Prophet Mohammed. 

He was a prolific translator. His notable translations include: Doctor Samuel Johnson nu Jivancharitra (Biography of Samuel Johnson, 1839), Malatimadhav (1893), Priyadarshika and Sanyasi. He had translated large number of Bengali works in Gujarati including works of Rabindranath Tagore. He has also written on literature, education and music.

See also
 List of Gujarati-language writers

Notes

References

External links
 About Hemchandra in The Story of My Experiments with Truth by Mahatma Gandhi

1855 births
1904 deaths
Mahatma Gandhi
Indian male poets
Gujarati-language poets
19th-century Indian translators
19th-century Indian poets
Indian autobiographers
Gujarati-language writers
Indian critics
People from Diu
Writers from Mumbai
Indian novelists
Indian short story writers